Trichoridia is a genus of moths of the family Noctuidae.

Species
 Trichoridia albiluna Hampson, 1906
 Trichoridia canosparsa (Hampson, 1894)
 Trichoridia cuprescens Hampson, 1906
 Trichoridia dentata (Hampson, 1894)
 Trichoridia endroma (Swinhoe, 1893)
 Trichoridia eristicum (Püngeler, 1906)
 Trichoridia fulminea (Leech, 1900)
 Trichoridia hampsoni (Leech, 1900)
 Trichoridia herchatera (Swinhoe, 1893)
 Trichoridia junctura (Hampson, 1894)
 Trichoridia leuconephra Draudt, 1950
 Trichoridia sikkimensis (Moore, 1881)

References
Natural History Museum Lepidoptera genus database
Trichoridia at funet

Cuculliinae